Germany Valley, located in Rabun County in the U.S. state of Georgia, four miles northwest of Clayton, is a gently sloping valley surrounded by Blue Ridge Mountain peaks. The Germany community is often referred to by local residents as "Germany Mountain," although there is actually no named peak in the area by that name.

Forestland, much of it owned by the United States Forest Service, surrounds the valley.

Germany Valley is framed by numerous mountain peaks. Big Face rises above the valley's southern edge and dominates most valley vistas. Also on the Eastern Continental Divide is  Black Rock Mountain at the eastern end of the valley, which is the centerpiece of Georgia's highest state park. Perhaps the best views of Germany Valley are from the park's Tennessee Rock Overlook.

Because of its altitude, Germany Valley experiences a significantly cooler climate than surrounding mountain valleys. Daily weather data are recorded by the National Weather Service's Germany Valley cooperative observation station. Low temperatures in the teens are not uncommon, and single-digit lows occasionally occur. Temperatures below zero are less common and do not occur every winter.

Precipitation in the valley is plentiful, as it is across much of the southern Appalachians. Snowfall is somewhat sporadic in the valley but occurs a number of times each winter. Snowfall averages approximately  a year.

Germany Valley is drained by southwest-flowing Timpson Creek, which flows into the Timpson Cove arm of Lake Burton, the uppermost of five Georgia Power reservoirs on the Tallulah River, one of the northernmost watersheds in the Savannah River basin.

References

Valleys of Georgia (U.S. state)
Landforms of Rabun County, Georgia